Joël Fuchs, (born June 24, 1989) is a Swiss professional basketball player.  He currently plays for the Starwings Basel of the Ligue Nationale de Basketball in Switzerland where he is the team captain.

He has been a member of the Swiss national basketball team on several occasions.

References

External links
Real GM Profile
Eurobasket.com Profile

1989 births
Living people
Swiss men's basketball players
People from Dielsdorf District
Point guards
Sportspeople from the canton of Zürich
Starwings Basel players